Tati Essad Murad Kryeziu, Prince of Kosova (24 December 1923 – 17 August 1993) was the heir presumptive to the throne of Albania from the creation of monarchy, under King Zog I, on 1 September 1928 prior to the birth of Crown Prince Leka on 5 April 1939.

Tati Kryeziu was born in Tirana the son of Princess Nafijé Zogu and Ceno Bey Kryeziu.

In 1931, he was created Prince of Kosova (Princ i Kosovës), with the style of His Highness , as heir presumptive to the Albanian throne (1928–1939).

He married, as her second husband, Munira Fawzi née Sabri, a relative of Queen Nazli of Egypt, at Cannes, France, on 24 February 1952. They divorced in 1970. He died in Cannes, France, on 17 August 1993 without issue.

Notes

1923 births
1993 deaths
Tati
Tati
Albanian nobility
Tati
Tati
People from Tirana